Calvin Maglinger (December 5, 1924 – January 20, 2010) was an American fine-art painter.

Background
Born in Owensboro, Kentucky, Maglinger was an American artist who specialized in historical, nature-based paintings. His siblings included two sisters and eight brothers. After World War II, under the GI bill, Maglinger entered the Kansas City Art Institute. He received a diploma in Graphic Arts in 1949 and a Bachelor of Fine Arts degree in 1950. He also held a diploma in Commercial Art from the Famous Artist's School in Westport, Connecticut.

Maglinger was Manager of Creative Services for Texas Gas Transmission Corporation from 1956 to 1967 and Art Director of the Evansville Printing Corporation from 1967 till his retirement in 1988.

More than twenty of Maglinger's paintings were reproduced as limited edition prints.  Over 17,000 of these prints have been sold nationally. His Regional Art Series, popularized in the 1980s, was well received and won wide acclaim. A recipient of numerous awards, the artist had been honored with one-man shows and his originals are in the collections of a number of midwest art patrons. Maglinger was given a special medallion from the Indiana State Museum for the painting "Foggy Morn." His painting "Quiet Time," appeared on the "Artists of America" calendar in 1995 and he completed historical paintings of Ohio River for the Casino Aztar Evansville riverboat in 1999. He is also admired by and inspired many local Indiana artists including Evelyn Steinkuhl.

Although Maglinger was better known for his paintings, he had proven capabilities in commercial and graphic art, wrote and illustrated two books and was the holder of several patents.  Maglinger's graphic art ranged from cartoons to rendering of court trials for newspapers and television. This, along with his paintings of wildlife, landscapes portraits and illustrations, revealed a diversity of talent.

Collections
The largest collection of Maglinger's original artwork is held by Maglinger's sons and the Indiana State Museum. Maglinger's grandson, also an artist, holds numerous original sketches and paintings.

Personal life
He died on January 20, 2010, in Evansville, Indiana.  He is survived by two sons, Stan and Paul, four grandchildren and four great-grandchildren.

Publications
 "God's Mother-In-Law" (1999)
 "Cause the Bible Sez So!" (2006)

Original Paintings
As mentioned above, over 20 of Maglinger's originals were printed and released in limited edition series.

Typically, 500 were released/sold as signed and numbered and an additional 2500-3000 were released/sold

as signed only. Most releases are 'sold out'.

Below, are images of some of Maglinger's prints.

--- Images to come ---
Bon Harbor Hills
Autumn Rain
Doe Run
First Snow
The Tenants

--- NOTABLE PAINTINGS ---

References

20th-century American painters
American male painters
21st-century American painters
Artists from Indiana
Writers from Indiana
Writers from Kentucky
People from Owensboro, Kentucky
Realism (art movement)
1924 births
2010 deaths
Fantastic art
Painters from Kentucky
Kansas City Art Institute alumni
American military personnel of World War II
20th-century American male artists